B. Ajithkumar (also known B. Ajith Kumar) is an Indian film editor and director. He has won the National Award for Best Editing in 2007 for Naalu Pennungal as well as the Kerala State Film Award for Best Editor in 2002 (for Nizhalkuthu and Bhavam), 2013 for Annayum Rasoolum, and 2017 (for Kammatipaadam).
Ajithkumar graduated from Film and Television Institute of India, Pune. After graduating, he started his career as film editor. His debut directorial film was Eeda, which depicts the violent political atmosphere of Kannur.

Filmography

Feature films

Documentaries

References

External links 
 

Malayalam film directors
Kerala State Film Award winners
Malayalam screenwriters
1973 births
Living people
People from Ernakulam district
Film directors from Kerala
Screenwriters from Kerala
21st-century Indian film directors
Malayalam film producers
Film producers from Kerala
Malayalam film editors
Film and Television Institute of India alumni